The canton of Wassy is an administrative division of the Haute-Marne department, northeastern France. Its borders were modified at the French canton reorganisation which came into effect in March 2015. Its seat is in Wassy.

It consists of the following communes:
 
Attancourt
Bailly-aux-Forges
Brousseval
Ceffonds
Dommartin-le-Franc
Doulevant-le-Petit
Frampas
Laneuville-à-Rémy
Montreuil-sur-Blaise
Morancourt
Planrupt
La Porte du Der
Rachecourt-Suzémont
Rives-Dervoises
Sommevoire
Thilleux
Vaux-sur-Blaise
Ville-en-Blaisois
Voillecomte
Wassy

References

Cantons of Haute-Marne